Crossroads Center is a shopping mall located in Waterloo, Iowa, United States. It was built in 1970 as one of the first malls in Iowa. The mall's sole anchor store is At Home. It has four vacant anchors formerly occupied by Sears, Dillard's, Gordmans, and Younkers. It is owned by Namdar Realty Group. It is located in the heart of a retail hub that includes a 12 screen theater, Best Buy, Super Target (opened 2000), Walmart, Barnes & Noble, Bed Bath & Beyond and many other national tenants. The mall is located near the interchange of Interstate 380 and U.S. Highway 20.

History
Crossroads Center Inc. announced plans for the mall in 1967, along with two other malls of the same name: one in St. Cloud, Minnesota and one in Fort Dodge, Iowa.

The Sears anchor store opened first, on March 24, 1969. The mall itself opened one year later, in March 1970, as both the only two-story mall and the first enclosed mall in Iowa. The JCPenney anchor store opened along with the mall, as did Black's department store. Black's became Donaldson's in 1978 and then Carson Pirie Scott in 1987. The store closed on September 30, 1989.

The upper level of the JCPenney anchor store was converted to a Herberger's anchor store in 1989. In 1991, Sears rented a 57,000 sq ft portion of its anchor store to become a Phar-Mor pharmacy. In 1993, 1/2 Price Store (later renamed Gordmans) took over that space. Herberger's was renamed Younkers in 1997. The mall was renovated in 1997 at a cost of $4 million. At the same time, Dillard's constructed a new 155,000 sq ft anchor store connected to the mall, at a cost of $20 million, rather than leasing space. The Dillard's anchor store opened on August 13, 1997. All 1/2 Price Store locations were renamed Gordmans in 2000.

On January 8, 2015, it was announced that JCPenney would close, as part of a plan to close 39 locations nationwide. At Home replaced the store in 2016. On January 4, 2018, it was announced that Sears would close, as part of a plan to close 103 stores nationwide. The store closed in April 2018. On April 18, 2018, Younkers parent company, the Bon-Ton, announced they would be completely liquidating and closing all stores including the one at Crossroads. The store closed on August 29, 2018. On May 11, 2020, Gordmans announced that it would be closing as the parent company is also going out of business. Just eight days later, Dillard's announced that this location would close. This left At Home as the only traditional anchor store.

References

External links
 Crossroads Center official website

Shopping malls in Iowa
Buildings and structures in Waterloo, Iowa
Tourist attractions in Black Hawk County, Iowa
Shopping malls established in 1970
1970 establishments in Iowa
Namdar Realty Group